Melhus (or Nedre Melhus) is the administrative centre of Melhus municipality in Trøndelag county, Norway.

The village lies along the European route E06 highway as well as the Dovrebanen railway line. The railroad stops at the Melhus Station in the central part of the village. Melhus is the largest urban area in the municipality, so it has a mall, many stores and businesses, restaurants, banks, a medical centre, a school, and the municipal government offices.

History
Melhus was the site of many important events during the Viking Era. It was the site of the Rimul farm in Melhus at which Jarl Haakon was killed by his slave, Tormod Kark. Jarlshola is the location in Melhus thought to have been the hiding place of Jarl Haakon and Tormod Kark on their last night before the infamous murder at Rimul.

Name
The village (originally the prestegjeld) is named after the old Melhus farm, since the first Melhus Church was built there.  The first element is meðal which means "middle" and the last element is the plural form of hús which means  "house".  The farm is one part of a greater and older farm, which had the name Óðinssalr which means "the salr (mead hall) of Odin".

Media gallery

References

Villages in Trøndelag
Melhus